Zero Day is a 2003 American found footage drama film written and directed by Ben Coccio and starring Andre Keuck and Cal Robertson revolving  around a plot about a duo planning a school shooting.

Plot
Andre Kriegman (born July 17, 1982) and Calvin "Cal" Gabriel (born February 5, 1983) announce their intention to attack their high school, Iroquois High School, calling their plan "Zero Day". They keep a video diary on the camera, carefully hiding their plans from their friends and families. The majority of the film is portrayed through their video filming, and shows them planning, preparing, and mentioning some of their motives.

Other scenes show the two attending Andre's birthday party, egging the house of Brad Huff, and Cal going to the prom while Andre works at a pizza place. In one video entry, Cal notes the origin of the name "Zero Day": Cal and Andre originally planned to attack the first day on which the temperature dropped to zero degrees after they had finished their preparations. This plan soon proved impractical, and they set May 1, 2001, as the new date. Wanting their attack to have a memorable name, they agreed to keep the original title.

The two arrive at school on May 1 and prepare their plan and weapons in Andre's car. Andre says that he could never have carried out Zero Day without his partner Cal's help, a sentiment that Cal echoes. They run into the school, armed with three pistols, an M1 carbine, and a 12-gauge pump-action shotgun, all stolen from Andre's father and cousin. The massacre is shown through the viewpoint of security cameras. The dialogue is heard via the cellphone of student Omar who was shot and killed. Shooting at anyone they see and threatening and taunting several witnesses, Andre and Cal kill eleven students and one school resource officer and wound eighteen others. The pair eventually see law enforcement entering the school in force after sixteen minutes of shooting. After arguing over whether to engage the police in gunfire, the pair decide to count to three and shoot themselves.

On May 10, a gang of youths film themselves going to a park where both are standing, where they find crosses for the two shooters and light them on fire.

Cast
In order of appearance:
 Andre Keuck as Andre Kriegman
 Cal Robertson as Calvin Gabriel
 Christopher Coccio as Chris Kriegman
 Gerhard Keuck as Andre's Father
 Johanne Keuck as Andre's Mother
 Rachel Benichak as Rachel Lurie
 Pam Robertson as Cal's Mother
 Steve Robertson as Cal's Father
 Omar Walters as shooting victim Omar

Production
Ben Coccio recalls that he was in a Brooklyn pizzeria on the day of the 1999 Columbine High School massacre, and saw coverage of the event on the eatery's television, commenting, "I remember thinking that I was surprised that it hadn't happened sooner." Coccio was also struck by the extent to which Eric Harris and Dylan Klebold planned that shooting, compared to the impromptu crimes of passion that typified other school shootings. Coccio became eager to address a story in a way that was very different and not exploitative, and drew upon his own views of high school as a place of tension where "anything could happen at any time". Coccio's theory of student school shooters is not that they are the most bullied, as such students tend to develop feelings of inferiority and are likely to harm themselves. Coccio feels that shooters tend to be students with feelings of superiority, and that "when other people don’t confirm that, it really gets under their skin."

None of the numerous Connecticut high schools where he sought to film the movie would allow Coccio access, and he ended up using the interior of a building at State University of New York at Purchase in Purchase, New York. The "appropriately fortress-like" exterior of the High School was New Milford High School in New Milford, Connecticut, where Coccio lived at the time.

When casting, Coccio inquired at high schools throughout Connecticut looking for teenagers interested in acting who might not have much or any professional experience. Coccio had three days of open auditions. Andre Keuck responded to an ad Coccio placed in Backstage Magazine and brought his classmate and fellow theater enthusiast Cal Robertson along to the audition. Both boys had acted in Shakespeare productions at the Stratford Avon theater in Stratford, Connecticut. They were encouraged to improvise throughout the film's production.

Website
An official website was made as a tie-in to promote the film, made to look like an official police report by the fictional "Essex County Sheriff's Department" on the event, describing details about the massacre that were never seen in the final film and glimpses about the perpetrators, the weapons used, and mentions that the movie actually consists of footage sent at the request of Kriegman and Gabriel's parents to an amateur filmmaker friend. The website is now archived by use of the Wayback Machine, although some features that would push the narrative that it was real have been lost.

Reception
Zero Day has received mostly positive reviews from critics, currently holding a 68% approval rating on Rotten Tomatoes based on 41 critic reviews. Despite the positive reception from critics and audiences, Zero Day was a box office bomb, gaining only $8,466 against a $20,000 budget.

Awards

 Atlanta Film Festival – Grand Jury Award 2003
 Boston Underground Film Festival – Best of Festival 2003
 Film Fest New Haven – Audience Choice Award, Best Dramatic Feature 2003
 Florida Film Festival – Grand Jury Award 2003
 Rhode Island Film Festival – Audience Award 2003
 Slamdunk Film Festival – Grand Jury Award 2003

See also
 Elephant, another Columbine-inspired film released in 2003
 Bowling for Columbine, a documentary about gun violence in America with emphasis on the Columbine massacre
 Duck! The Carbine High Massacre, a film made in 1999 inspired by the Columbine High School massacre
 Heart of America, another film revolving around a fictionalized school massacre
 The Only Way, a 2004 independent film inspired by the Columbine High School massacre
 List of films set around May Day

References

External links

 

2003 films
2000s English-language films
2003 independent films
2003 drama films
American drama films
Works about the Columbine High School massacre
2003 directorial debut films
Found footage films
Films about school violence
American films based on actual events
Films set in 2001
Films shot in New York (state)
Films shot in Connecticut
2000s American films